The Calhoun County Courthouse, built in 1913, is a historic courthouse located in the city of St. Matthews in  Calhoun County, South Carolina. It was designed in the Colonial Revival style by Darlington native William Augustus Edwards who designed eight other South Carolina courthouses as well as academic buildings at 12 institutions in Florida, Georgia and South Carolina. Calhoun County was created in 1908 and this is its first and only courthouse. It was listed on the National Register of Historic Places in 1981.

See also
List of Registered Historic Places in South Carolina

References

External links 
 South Carolina Association of Counties page for Calhoun County
 National Register listings for Calhoun County
 South Carolina Department of Archives and History file on Calhoun County Courthouse
 University of Florida biography of William Augustus Edwards
 

County courthouses in South Carolina
William Augustus Edwards buildings
Buildings and structures in Calhoun County, South Carolina
Courthouses on the National Register of Historic Places in South Carolina
National Register of Historic Places in Calhoun County, South Carolina